WIDG (940 AM) is a radio station licensed to St. Ignace, Michigan, broadcasting a Catholic religious format. Until October 2008, the station was owned and operated by Northern Star Broadcasting and had aired ESPN Radio under the brand name AM 940 The Fan. The station then went silent for a short period and returned to the air in December 2008, simulcasting originating station WTCK 90.9 FM in Charlevoix and later WTCY 88.3 FM in Greilickville and serving Traverse City.. WIDG was previously owned by Baraga Broadcasting and now owned by Relevant Radio.

Its main studio is now located in Traverse City, as such the originating station is now WTCY.  WIDG transmits from a single guyed omnidirectional antenna at 1230 Old Portage Trail in St. Ignace.

History
Founded in 1966 by Donald E. Benson's Mighty-Mac Broadcasting Company, WIDG was just the second radio station to launch in the Eastern Upper Peninsula of Michigan (following WSOO in Sault Ste. Marie.) The station was known for many years as "Widge by the Bridge" and aired mainly middle of the road music, at times a blend of top 40.

The nickname "Widge by the Bridge" was coined by a longtime friend of station founder Donald E. Benson, a Lansing-based dentist who thought WITL-Lansing's slogan "Whittle while you work" was something that WIDG needed.  The original CP for the station had the call letters WSTI, "St. Ignace" but Benson felt the call letters looked like "Stye". In the late 1970s, Benson obtained a construction permit for an FM station that would become WMKC.

Construction on the new FM station began shortly after the license was granted on July 30, 1979; and in December of that same year, Benson also obtained a dark license for WIDG and kept the station dark until April 1981, when he was required to return WIDG to the air in order for WMKC to come on the air.  WIDG returned with an MOR format until a format change to Big Band and standards and the call letters WLVM ("We Love Michigan", with the station's music format provided by TM's "TMOR" package). In 1985, the station returned to the WIDG calls with a top 40 oldies format until 1988, when WIDG simulcast sister FM's WMKC St. Ignace and WCKC-Cadillac's country music format.

Eventually, in the early 1990s, WIDG once again adopted separate programming from WMKC, airing first oldies (as "Cool 940") and then classic country (as "Classic KC Country") before the sports-talk format was introduced. WIDG was initially an affiliate of One-on-One Sports (which later became Sporting News Radio) before switching to the ESPN Radio feed.

WIDG operates with an omnidirectional antenna and with very low power after local sunset to avoid interference with the now-defunct CINW (formerly CBC Radio-owned CBM-AM) in Montreal. In WIDG's heyday, it constantly fought for a good signal into the north and was stymied by 10 kW CKCY-920 Sault Ste. Marie, Ontario.  WIDG's signal was obliterated by CKCY north of Rudyard.  When CKCY went dark, WIDG finally got the full potential of its 5 kW signal and can be heard well into the province of Ontario.

Though CINW (the former CBC Radio-owned CBM) has been silent since 2010, WIDG must still power down from 5,000 watts to 4 watts at sunset per FCC rules.

On December 11, 2019, WIDG and its sister stations were acquired by Immaculate Heart Media, bringing Relevant Radio programming to Northern Michigan.

FM translators
 W221CA 92.1 mHz in Gaylord

New studios, offices in Traverse City
Baraga's main studio and offices were originally located at WTCK's studio at Indian River, Michigan near The Cross in the Woods Catholic Shrine. It also airs national programming from EWTN Global Catholic Radio and Ave Maria Radio based at WDEO in Ypsilanti.

In the fall of 2014, Baraga Broadcasting announced plans for a new website The Catholic Light Dot Com which is now online and was used in transition from its former  Indian River  location to new studios in Traverse City, Michigan thus making WTCY (licensed to Greilickville) which serves Traverse City the new originating station.

See also
 WTCY 88.3 FM in Greilickville (originating station) which also serves Traverse City
 WGZR 89.1 FM in Alpena
 WTCK 90.9 FM in Charlevoix which also serves Harbor Springs, Indian River and Grayling
 WGJU 91.3 FM in East Tawas (the former WRQC)
 WMQU 1230 AM in Grayling (the former WGRY)

References

 Michiguide.com - WIDG History

External links
 Relevant Radio

 Picture of studio 1973 

Catholic radio stations
Radio stations established in 1966
1966 establishments in Michigan
IDG
Relevant Radio stations